Debian releases do not follow a fixed schedule. Recent releases have been made roughly biennially by the Debian Project. The most recent version of Debian is Debian version 11, codename "Bullseye". The next up and coming release of Debian is Debian 12, codename "Bookworm".

Debian always has at least three release branches active at any time: "stable", "testing" and "unstable". The stable release is the most recent and up-to-date version of Debian. The testing release contains packages that have been tested from unstable. Testing has significantly more up-to-date packages than stable and is a close version of the future release candidate for stable. The unstable release (also known as sid) is the release where active development takes place. It is the most volatile version of Debian.

When the Debian stable branch is replaced with a newer release, the current stable becomes an "oldstable" release. When the Debian stable branch is replaced again, the oldstable release becomes the "oldoldstable" release. Oldoldstable is eventually moved to the archived releases repository.

Naming convention 
Debian distribution codenames are based on the names of characters from the Toy Story films. Debian's unstable trunk is named after Sid, a character who regularly destroyed his toys.

Release table 

When a release transitions to long-term support phase (LTS-phase), security is no longer handled by the main Debian security team. Only a subset of Debian architectures are eligible for Long Term Support, and there is no support for packages in backports.

Release history
Debian 1.0 was never released, as a vendor accidentally shipped a development release with that version number. The package management system dpkg and its front-end dselect were developed and implemented on Debian in a previous release. A transition from the a.out binary format to the ELF binary format had already begun before the planned 1.0 release. The only supported architecture was Intel 80386 (i386).

Debian 1.1 (Buzz)
Debian 1.1 (Buzz), released 17 June 1996, contained 474 packages. Debian had fully transitioned to the ELF binary format and used Linux kernel 2.0.

Debian 1.2 (Rex)
Debian 1.2 (Rex), released 12 December 1996, contained 848 packages maintained by 120 developers.

Debian 1.3 (Bo)
Debian 1.3 (Bo), released 5 June 1997, contained 974 packages maintained by 200 developers.

Point releases:
 1.3.1
 1.3.1r1 (Release date unknown)
 1.3.1r2 (Release date unknown)
 1.3.1r3 (Release date unknown)
 1.3.1r4 (Release date unknown)
 1.3.1r5 (Release date unknown)
 1.3.1r6

Debian 2.0 (Hamm)
Debian 2.0 (Hamm), released 24 July 1998, contained over 1,500 packages maintained by over 400 developers. A transition was made to libc6 and Debian was ported to the Motorola 68000 series (m68k) architectures.

Point releases:
 2.0r1
 2.0r2
 2.0r3
 2.0r4
 2.0r5

Debian 2.1 (Slink)
Debian 2.1 (Slink), released 9 March 1999, contained about 2,250 packages. The front-end APT was introduced for the package management system and Debian was ported to Alpha and SPARC.

Point releases:
 2.1r1 (Possibly never released)
 2.1r2
 2.1r3
 2.1r4
 2.1r5

Debian 2.2 (Potato)
Debian 2.2 (Potato), released 14–15 August 2000, contained 2,600 packages maintained by more than 450 developers. New packages included the display manager GDM, the directory service OpenLDAP, the security software OpenSSH and the mail transfer agent Postfix. Debian was ported to the PowerPC and ARM architectures.

Point releases:
 2.2r1
 2.2r2
 2.2r3
 2.2r4
 2.2r5
 2.2r6
 2.2r7

Debian 3.0 (Woody)
Debian 3.0 (Woody), released 19 July 2002, contained around 8,500 packages maintained by more than 900 developers. KDE was introduced and Debian was ported to the following architectures: IA-64, PA-RISC (hppa), mips and mipsel and IBM ESA/390 (s390).

Point releases:
 3.0r1
 3.0r2
 3.0r3
 3.0r4
 3.0r5
 3.0r6

Debian 3.1 (Sarge)
Debian 3.1 (Sarge), released 6 June 2005, contained around 15,400 packages. debian-installer and OpenOffice.org were introduced.

Point releases:
 3.1r1
 3.1r2
 3.1r3
 3.1r4
 3.1r5
 3.1r6
 3.1r7
 3.1r8 this is the final update for codename Sarge.

Debian 4.0 (Etch)

Debian 4.0 (Etch), released 8 April 2007, contained around 18,000 packages maintained by more than 1,030 developers. Debian was ported to x86-64 (amd64) and support for the Motorola 68000 series (m68k) architecture was dropped. This version introduced utf-8 and udev device management by default.

Point releases:
4.0r1
4.0r2
4.0r3
4.0r4
4.0r5
4.0r6
4.0r7
4.0r8
4.0r9 this is the final update for codename Etch

Debian 5.0 (Lenny)

Debian 5.0 (Lenny), released 14 February 2009, contained more than 23,000 packages. Debian was ported to the ARM EABI (armel) architecture.

Point releases:
5.0.1
5.0.2
5.0.3
5.0.4
5.0.5
5.0.6
5.0.7
5.0.8
5.0.9
5.0.10 this is the final update for codename Lenny.

Debian 6.0 (Squeeze)

Debian 6.0 (Squeeze), released 6 February 2011, contained more than 29,000 packages. The default Linux kernel included was deblobbed beginning with this release. The web browser Chromium was introduced and Debian was ported to the kfreebsd-i386 and kfreebsd-amd64 architectures (while that port was later discontinued), and support for the Intel 486, Alpha, and PA-RISC (hppa) architectures was dropped.

Squeeze was the first release of Debian in which non-free firmware components (aka "binary blobs") were excluded from the "main" repository as a matter of policy.

Point releases:
6.0.1
6.0.2
6.0.3
6.0.4
6.0.5
6.0.6
6.0.7
6.0.8
6.0.9
6.0.10 this is the final update for codename Squeeze.
Squeeze long term support reaches end-of-life

Debian 7 (Wheezy)

Debian 7 (Wheezy), released 4 May 2013, contained more than 36,000 packages. Support for UEFI was added and Debian was ported to the armhf and IBM ESA/390 (s390x) architectures.

Point releases:
7.1
7.2
7.3
7.4
7.5
7.6
7.7
7.8
Debian 8.0 codename Jessie releases, Wheezy becomes oldstable
7.9
7.10
7.11 this is the final update for codename Wheezy.
Debian 9.0 codename Stretch releases, Wheezy becomes oldoldstable
Wheezy long term support reached end-of-life
Wheezy extended long term support reached end-of-life.

Debian 8 (Jessie)

Debian 8 (Jessie), released 25 April 2015, contained more than 43,000 packages, with systemd installed by default instead of init. (sysvinit and upstart packages are provided as alternatives.) Debian was ported to the ARM64 and ppc64le architectures, while support for the IA-64, kfreebsd-amd64 and kfreebsd-i386, IBM ESA/390 (s390) (only the 31-bit variant; the newer 64-bit s390x was retained) and SPARC architectures were dropped.

Long term support ended June 2020.

Point releases:
8.1
8.2
8.3
8.4
8.5
8.6
8.7
8.8
 Debian 9.0 codename Stretch releases, Jessie becomes oldstable
8.9
8.10
Regular security support updates have been discontinued
8.11 this is the final update for codename Jessie.
Debian 10.0 codename Buster releases, Jessie becomes oldoldstable
Jessie long term support reaches end-of-life
Jessie extended long term support reaches end-of-life

Debian 9 (Stretch)

Debian 9 (Stretch) was released on 17 June 2017, two years and two months after Debian 8.0, and contained more than 51,000 packages. Major upgrades include the Linux kernel going from version 3.16 to 4.9, GNOME desktop version going from 3.14 to 3.22, KDE Plasma 4 was upgraded to Plasma 5, LibreOffice 4.3 upgraded to 5.2 and Qt upgraded from 4.8 to 5.7. LXQt has been added as well.

The Intel i586 (Pentium), i586/i686 hybrid and PowerPC architectures are no longer supported as of Stretch.

Point releases:
9.1
9.2
9.3
9.4
9.5
9.6
9.7
9.8
9.9
Stretch becomes oldstable, Buster becomes stable release
9.10
9.11
9.12
9.13 this is the final update for codename Stretch.
Stretch long term support reaches end-of-life
Stretch extended long term support reaches end-of-life

Debian 10 (Buster)

It was two years and a month after Debian 9 (Stretch). Debian 10 contains 57,703 packages, supports UEFI Secure Boot, has AppArmor enabled by default, uses LUKS2 as the default LUKS format, and uses Wayland for GNOME by default.

Debian 10 ships with Linux kernel version 4.19. Available desktops include Cinnamon 3.8, GNOME 3.30, KDE Plasma 5.14, LXDE 0.99.2, LXQt 0.14, MATE 1.20, Xfce 4.12. Key application software includes LibreOffice 6.1 for office productivity, VLC 3.0 for media viewing, and Firefox ESR for web browsing.

Point releases:
10.1
10.2
10.3
10.4
10.5
10.6
10.7
10.8
10.9
10.10
Buster becomes oldstable, Bullseye is the current stable release
10.11
10.12
10.13 this is the final update for codename Buster

Debian 11 (Bullseye)

Debian 11 (Bullseye) was released on 14 August 2021. It is based on the Linux 5.10 LTS kernel and will be supported for five years.

On 12 November 2020, it was announced that "Homeworld", by Juliette Taka, will be the default theme for Debian 11, after winning a public poll held with eighteen choices.

Bullseye dropped the remaining Qt4/KDE 4 libraries and Python 2,
and shipped with Qt 5.15 KDE Plasma 5.20. Available desktops include Gnome 3.38, KDE Plasma 5.20, LXDE 11, LXQt 0.16, MATE 1.24, and Xfce 4.16.

Bullseye does not support the older big-endian 32-bit MIPS architectures. This is not to be confused with the more common i386 32-bit architecture which is still supported.

The first of the code freezes, readying Debian 11 for release, began on 12 January 2021.

Development freeze timetable:
 January 12, 2021: transition freeze
 February 12, 2021: soft freeze
 March 12, 2021: hard freeze
 July 17, 2021: full freeze
 August 14, 2021: release

Point releases:
11.1
11.2
11.3
11.4
11.5
11.6

Debian 12 (Bookworm)
Debian 12 (Bookworm) is the current testing release of Debian and is the next release candidate for Debian.

Debian 12 is expected to have link-time optimization (LTO) enabled by default.

Debian 12 might reduce focus on i386 support, though this has yet to be determined.

On 13 October, 2022, the Release Team announced the freeze development milestone timeline for this release:
 12 January, 2023: transition and toolchain freeze
 12 February, 2023: soft freeze
 12 March, 2023: hard freeze

Release timeline

Port timeline

Many of past architectures, plus some that have not yet achieved release status, are available from the debian-ports repository.

See also

 Summary of Debian version history
 Ubuntu version history
 Linux Mint version history

References

External links
 Debian Releases at Debian Wiki
 Debian Releases at debian.org
 

Debian
Lists of operating systems
Software version histories